National University (NU) is a private university with its headquarters in San Diego, California. Founded in 1971, National University offers academic degree programs at campuses throughout California, a satellite campus in Nevada, and various programs online. Programs at National University are designed for adult learners. On-campus classes are typically blended learning courses, concentrated to four weeks or on weeknights with occasional Saturday classes. The university uses asynchronous learning and real-time virtual classrooms for its online programs.

History
National University founder David Chigos, a former United States Navy captain and director of employee training for General Dynamics Corporation, established the school as a non-traditional university for working adults. In 1971, National University was organized as a private, non-profit institution with 27 students. The university's first commencement ceremony had 143 graduates. From 1971-1975, the university was based at 1050 Rosecrans St. in San Diego. In 1975, National purchased two properties in Mission Valley as its headquarters. Two years later, National opened teaching facilities in Kearny Mesa and San Diego County. During that time, the school gained approximately 1000 alumni and received accreditation from the Western Association of Schools and Colleges. National also acquired the Cabrillo Pacific College of Law in 1979, which closed in 1991.

During the 1980s, National expanded by establishing several satellite campuses in California. The School of Education was established in 1980. In 1988, Chigos retired and Jerry C. Lee became the university's second president from 1989 to 2007. During Lee's tenure, campuses were restructured, the university's finances stabilized, National's academics were formally reviewed by accrediting bodies, and affiliate institutions were added to the university. In 1996, the headquarters of the university was moved from Mission Valley to La Jolla and online degree programs were established.

The Board of Trustees established the National University System in 2001 with Jerry Lee appointed as Chancellor of the system. The university was re-organized as a multi-tiered alliance of individual educational and research institutions with each of its respective leaders (including the National University president) reporting to the chancellor. In 2006, National University earned an Emmy Award from the National Academy of Television Arts & Sciences, Pacific Southwest Chapter, for its "One University" commercial. In 2007, Dana Gibson was appointed as National's third president, and Lee became President Emeritus. Two years later, Gibson left National and Patricia E. Potter served as Interim President. Michael R. Cunningham became President and Chancellor in 2013.

As of 2010, National University was the second-largest private, non-profit institution of higher education in California and the 12th largest private, non-profit organization in the United States. At National University's 40th anniversary, the system had an endowment of over $400 million and real estate valued over $145 million. The university had over 24,000 enrollment with over 130 undergraduate and graduate academic degree programs and 23 teacher credential programs at 28 campuses in California, a satellite campus in Henderson, Nevada, and over 100 online academic programs.

In 2019, T. Denny Sanford donated $350 million to National University to rename the university's School of Education to the Sanford College of Education. In addition to the name change, a tuition decrease was announced, aided by Sanford's donation.

In July 2022 National announced a merger with Northcentral University, an entirely online institution specializing in advanced degrees. The merger will bring the combined enrollment to more than 42,000 students.

Academics
National University confers associate's degrees, bachelor's degrees, master's degrees, teaching credentials, and continuing education programs.

Accreditation and approvals
National University is accredited by the Western Association of Schools and Colleges (WASC).
In addition to being accredited by WASC, National University also is:

 Accredited by the International Assembly for Collegiate Business Education (IACBE)
Accredited by the National Council for Accreditation of Teacher Education (NCATE), California Commission on Teacher Credentialing (CTC), and the Nevada State Board of Education
Accredited by the California Board of Registered Nursing (BRN) Approved by the Commission on Collegiate Nursing Education (CCNE) for the offering of the Bachelor of Science in Nursing Program
Accredited by the Accreditation Board for Engineering and Technology (ABET)
Accredited by the Council on Education in Public Health (CEPH)

National University is organized as four professional schools and two colleges: 
College of Letters and Sciences
Sanford College of Education
School of Business and Management
School of Engineering and Computing
School of Health and Human Services
School of Professional Studies

The university also has a Division of Extended Learning, which houses continuing education, professional development programs, and 23 teacher credential/certificate programs. Since 1996, National University offers more than 100 degree programs through over 1,500 courses online.

National University received sanctions in 2021, threatening its regional accreditation, when a scathing report from the American Association of University Professors revealed the institution made a series of sweeping changes that included firing 50 full-time professors, six associate vice presidents, unilateral changes to the school's governance structure, consolidation of its libraries into a central library without any meaningful consultation with the faculty or library staff, closing several campuses across California, and bypassing the faculty when making decisions regarding the discontinuation of several academic programs.

Graduation rate
National's graduation rate for the 2014 academic year is 71% at undergraduate level and 65% at the graduate level.

College of Letters and Sciences
National University's College of Letters and Sciences provides undergraduate, general education courses to students enrolled in all other schools of the university. The college itself has four departments and offers an Associate of Arts degree, liberal arts bachelor's degrees in biological science, history, and psychology. It also offers master's degrees in creative writing, English, film studies, gerontology, and strategic communications.

School of Business and Management
The School of Business and Management offers business degree programs on campus and online. The school is composed of three departments and also offers various master's degrees. The school offers a Bachelors in Business Administration, Master of Business Administration (MBA), Master of Accountancy, and Master of Science in Organizational Leadership.

Sanford College of Education
The College of Education offers bachelor's degrees, master's degrees, certificates, and education credentials in areas including teaching, school counseling, school psychology, special education, early childhood education, and school administration. National holds teaching contracts with 643 California school districts and approximately 70% of the 26,000 teachers in San Diego County earned teaching credentials from National University. At the University's Henderson campus, the College of Education offers Bachelor of Arts and Master of Arts teacher licensure programs in elementary education, secondary math, and secondary English. In 2015, National University renamed the School of Education to the Sanford College of Education in honor of philanthropist T. Denny Sanford. The college also houses the Sanford Education Center and two of its programs: the Sanford Harmony Program which promotes respect and understanding of differences among children by expanding understanding and acceptance of gender differences at an early age to positively affect adult relationships and the Sanford Institute of Philanthropy which offers a certificate in Cause Sales and hosts various professional development workships in nonprofit management.

School of Engineering and Computing
The School of Engineering and Computing offers degree programs in engineering, technology, computer science, and other related fields. The school focuses curriculum on management information systems, construction engineering, electrical engineering, and information technology management.

School of Health and Human Services
The School of Health and Human Services offers undergraduate and graduate degree programs in clinical health sciences, healthcare administration, nursing, public health, allied health, clinical laboratory science, radiation therapy, and clinical regulatory affairs.

School of Professional Studies
The School of Professional Studies offers academic degree programs in digital media, paralegal, pre-law, criminal justice, and several others.

Campus locations
National University is geographically dispersed, with its academic and administrative centers located in La Jolla, California. These centers include administrative offices of the president, vice presidents, school deans and department chairs, financial aid, registrar, and admissions. From its administrative center, the university maintains its academic campuses throughout urban areas in California and Nevada. The university's satellite campuses are located in: 

 San Diego County
 Fresno
 Henderson, Nevada
 West Los Angeles (LAX area)

 Oxnard
 Rancho Cordova (Sacramento)
 San Jose

Organization
The NU System is governed by a board of trustees and is headquartered in La Jolla, California. The board meets three times a year, consisting of 25 voting members with two ex-officio members (the president of the university and the chancellor of the system) also holding voting privileges.

National University System
National University is the flagship institution of the National University System. In addition to National University, there are four academic affiliates and two research institutes of the National University System:

 City University of Seattle, Seattle, Washington (affiliated since 2013)
 National University Academy, Vista, California (established 2008)
 National University Virtual High School, Chula Vista, California (established 2003)
 Northcentral University, San Diego, California (affiliated since 2019)
 The Center for Performance Psychology
 The National University System Institute for Policy Research

John F. Kennedy University was an affiliate of the National University System from 2009 until JFKU was closed in 2020, at which time JFKU's programs were continued by other universities in the National University System.

Student body
National University is the second-largest private, non-profit institution of higher education in California by total enrollment. The average age of an NU student is 32. Roughly 23,000 full-time undergraduate and graduate students are currently enrolled with nine percent of the student body also in active military service. National University is also one of the largest graduate student institutions of higher education in the United States with 23,909 students enrolled. The university has approximately 190,000 alumni from all 50 states and internationally.

Notable alumni
Lloyd Bryan Molander Adams, co-founder of Extreme Sports Channel
Chris Brown, Mayor of Hawthorne, California
Ocky Clark, runner
Thomas S. Crow, Master Chief Petty Officer of the Navy from 1979–1982
Duke Cunningham, US Navy fighter pilot ace, 7 term US Congressman, and convicted felon
Gerry Czarnecki, business executive and author of books on leadership principles
Marti Emerald, local television journalist and city council member from San Diego, California
Brian Graham, major league baseball coach
Isadore Hall III, California state senator
Chief Phil Lane, Jr., a leader of American indigenous peoples
Steven Paul Logan, United States district judge, who being a Marine Corps Colonel (now reserve) concurrently serves on the Navy-Marine Corps Court of Criminal Appeals
Weston Ochse, author
Frank Pastore, major league pitcher and radio host
Jerry Sanders, former mayor and earlier chief of police of San Diego, California
Erick Thohir, majority owner of two professional soccer teams
Billy Pat Wright, multi-term member of the Missouri House of Representatives
Ryan Zinke, U.S. Secretary of the Interior, Navy SEAL, U.S. Navy commander, special operations commander during Iraq War, later elected the U.S. representative from Montana
Jaime Bonilla, Governor of the State of Baja California in Mexico

References

External links

 Official website

Business schools in California
Private universities and colleges in California
Distance education institutions based in the United States
Universities and colleges in Fresno County, California
Universities and colleges in Los Angeles
Universities and colleges in Los Angeles County, California
Universities and colleges in San Diego
Universities and colleges in Sacramento County, California
Universities and colleges in San Joaquin County, California
Universities and colleges in Shasta County, California
Universities and colleges in Ventura County, California
Universities and colleges in Clark County, Nevada
Schools accredited by the Western Association of Schools and Colleges
Educational institutions established in 1971
Education in Henderson, Nevada
Education in Fresno, California
Redding, California
Education in Sacramento, California
Education in San Diego
Universities and colleges in San Jose
Oxnard, California
1971 establishments in California
Private universities and colleges in Nevada